Aedanus Burke (June 16, 1743March 30, 1802) was a soldier, judge, and United States Representative from South Carolina. He was a slaveholder.

Life  
Born in Tiaquin, County Galway in the Kingdom of Ireland, he attended the theological College of Saint Omer, visited New Orleans, visited the West Indies, and moved back to the American Colonies, settling in Charles Town, South Carolina (now Charleston.) He served in the militia forces of South Carolina during the American Revolutionary War and was appointed a judge of the State circuit court in 1778, serving until the enemy overran the state. He was a member of the South Carolina House of Representatives from 1778 to 1779, and again served in the Revolutionary Army from 1780 to 1782.

In 1783 he published two pamphlets, An Address to the Freemen of South Carolina (January 1783) and Considerations on the Society or Order of Cincinnati (October 1783), under the pseudonym Cassius where he criticized the nascent Society of the Cincinnati for being an attempt at reestablishing a hereditary nobility in the new republic.

When the courts were reestablished, Burke resumed his seat on the bench, and in 1785 was appointed one of three commissioners to prepare a digest of the State laws. He was a member of the convention in 1788 called to consider ratification of the Constitution of the United States, which he opposed; he was elected as an Anti-Administration candidate to the First United States Congress (March 4, 1789 – March 3, 1791). He declined to be a candidate for reelection in 1790 to the Second Congress, the legislature having passed a law prohibiting a State judge from leaving the State; he was elected a chancellor of the courts of equity in 1799 and served until his death in Charleston in 1802. As the senior member of the South Carolina appellate courts from 1796 to 1799, Burke was the Chief Justice of South Carolina.  Interment was in the cemetery of the Chapel of Ease of St. Bartholomew's Parish, near Jacksonboro, South Carolina.

References

External links

Members of the United States House of Representatives from South Carolina
Members of the South Carolina House of Representatives
Anti-Federalists
1743 births
1802 deaths
People of South Carolina in the American Revolution
Burials in South Carolina
Kingdom of Ireland emigrants to the Thirteen Colonies
Politicians from County Galway